This is a comprehensive list of victories of the  cycling team. The races are categorized according to the UCI rules.

2005 – Shimano–Memory Corp
Stage 2 Tour of Siam, Kaoru Ouchi
Niedersachsen-Rundfahrt, Stefan Schumacher
Stage 1, 2 & 3 Rheinland-Pfalz Rundfahrt, Stefan Schumacher
Overall Ster Elektrotoer, Stefan Schumacher
 Japanese National Road Race Championships,  Hidenori Nodera

2006 – Skil Shimano

Grand Prix Pino Cerami, Sebastian Langeveld
Overall Tour of Belgium, Maarten Tjallingii
Stage 1, Maarten Tjallingii
Stage 2 Tour du Luxembourg, Paul Martens
Stage 1 Ster Elektrotoer, Aart Vierhouten
Noord Nederland Tour, Aart Vierhouten
Overall Tour of Qinghai Lake, Maarten Tjallingii
Stage 1 & 2, René Weissinger
Stage 7, Maarten Tjallingii
Münsterland Giro, Paul Martens

2007 – Skil Shimano
Ronde van Noord-Holland, Kenny van Hummel
Stage 2 Ster Elektrotoer, Paul Martens
Profronde van Friesland, Maarten Den Bakker
Nationale Sluitingsprijs, Floris Goesinnen

2008 – Skil Shimano

Stage 7 Jelajah Malaysia, Yusuke Hatanaka
Ronde van Noord-Holland, Robert Wagner
Stage 1 Tour de Picardie, Sebastian Siedler
 Japanese National Road Race Championships,  Hidenori Nodera
Stage 1 Delta Tour Zeeland, Robert Wagner
Stage 1 Tour de Korea, Shinri Suzuki
Stage 7 Tour of Qinghai Lake, Tom Veelers
Stage 1b Brixia Tour, Team Time Trial
Stage 1 Tour de l'Ain, Floris Goesinnen
Stage 1 Tour of South China Sea, Ji Cheng

2009 – Skil Shimano

Ronde van Overijssel, Kenny van Hummel
Stage 1 Four Days of Dunkirk, Kenny van Hummel
Batavus Prorace, Kenny van Hummel
Dutch Food Valley Classic, Kenny van Hummel
Tour de Rijke, Kenny van Hummel
Stage 2 Delta Tour Zeeland, Robert Wagner
Stage 9 Tour of Qinghai Lake, Tom Veelers

2010 – Skil Shimano

Stage 2 Driedaagse van West-Vlaanderen, Robert Wagner
Hel van het Mergelland, Yann Huguet
Ronde van Noord-Holland, Robert Wagner
Ronde van Overijssel, Job Vissers
Stage 1 Tour de Picardie, Kenny van Hummel
Stage 2 Bayern-Rundfahrt, Robert Wagner
Stage 2 Tour of Belgium, Kenny van Hummel
Stage 4 Tour of Belgium, Dominique Cornu
Stage 1 Delta Tour Zeeland, Mitchell Docker
Stage 2 Delta Tour Zeeland, Robert Wagner
Stage 3 Route du Sud, Mitchell Docker
Stage 4, 5, 7 & 9 Tour of Hainan, Kenny van Hummel

2011 – Skil Shimano

Stage 3 Tour de Langkawi, Marcel Kittel
Stage 2 Critérium International, Simon Geschke
Overall Ronde van Drenthe, Kenny van Hummel
Stages 1 & 2, Kenny van Hummel
Stage 8 Presidential Cycling Tour of Turkey, Kenny van Hummel
Stages 1, 2, 3 & 5 Four Days of Dunkirk, Marcel Kittel
ProRace Berlin, Marcel Kittel
Overall Delta Tour Zeeland, Marcel Kittel
Stage 1, Marcel Kittel
Halle–Ingooigem, Roy Curvers
Stage 4 Tour of Austria, Alexandre Geniez
Stages 1, 2, 3 & 7 Tour de Pologne, Marcel Kittel
Stage 7 Vuelta a España, Marcel Kittel
Memorial Rik Van Steenbergen, Kenny van Hummel
Kampioenschap van Vlaanderen, Marcel Kittel
Stage 3 Circuit Franco-Belge, Tom Veelers
Münsterland Giro, Marcel Kittel
Stages 3 & 5 Herald Sun Tour, Marcel Kittel
Stage 3 Tour of Hainan, Tom Veelers
Stages 6, 7 & 9 Tour of Hainan, Kenny van Hummel

2012 – Project 1t4i / Argos–Shimano

 Japanese National Road Race Championships, Yukihiro Doi
Overall UCI Europe Tour, John Degenkolb
Stage 2 Étoile de Bessèges, Marcel Kittel
Stages 3 & 6 Tour of Oman, Marcel Kittel
Prologue Vuelta a Andalucía, Patrick Gretsch
Stage 2 Three Days of De Panne, Marcel Kittel
Scheldeprijs, Marcel Kittel
Stages 1 & 2 Four Days of Dunkirk, John Degenkolb
Overall Tour de Picardie, John Degenkolb
Stages 1 & 3, John Degenkolb
Stages 1 & 4 Ster ZLM Toer, Marcel Kittel
Stage 7 Tour de Pologne, John Degenkolb
Stages 1 & 4 Eneco Tour, Marcel Kittel
Stages 2, 5, 7, 10 & 21 Vuelta a España, John Degenkolb
Kampioenschap van Vlaanderen, Ronan van Zandbeek
Grand Prix d'Isbergues, John Degenkolb
Omloop van het Houtland, Marcel Kittel
Stages 2 & 3 Tour de l'Eurometropole, Marcel Kittel
Münsterland Giro, Marcel Kittel
Stages 5 & 8 Tour of Hainan, Ramon Sinkeldam

2013 – Argos–Shimano

Stage 1 Tour of Oman, Marcel Kittel
Stage 2 Paris–Nice, Marcel Kittel
Stage 5 Volta a Catalunya, François Parisien
Scheldeprijs, Marcel Kittel
Stages 1, 7 & 8 Tour of Turkey, Marcel Kittel
Stage 5 Giro d'Italia, John Degenkolb
Overall Tour de Picardie, Marcel Kittel
Stages 1 & 3, Marcel Kittel
ProRace Berlin, Marcel Kittel
Stage 3 Ster ZLM Toer, Marcel Kittel
Stages 1, 10, 12 & 21 Tour de France, Marcel Kittel
Stage 3 Arctic Race of Norway, Nikias Arndt
Vattenfall Cyclassics, John Degenkolb
Stages 13 & 16 Vuelta a España, Warren Barguil
Grote Prijs Jef Scherens, Bert De Backer
Omloop van het Houtland, Marcel Kittel
Stages 2 & 4 Tour de l'Eurometropole, John Degenkolb
Binche–Chimay–Binche, Reinardt Janse van Rensburg
Paris–Bourges, John Degenkolb
Paris–Tours, John Degenkolb
Stage 5 Tour of Beijing, Luka Mezgec

2014 – Giant–Shimano

People's Choice Classic, Marcel Kittel
Stages 2, 3 & 4 Dubai Tour, Marcel Kittel
 Overall Étoile de Bessèges, Tobias Ludvigsson
Stage 5 (ITT), Tobias Ludvigsson
Stages 1, 2 & 3 Tour Méditerranéen, John Degenkolb
Stage 3 Paris–Nice, John Degenkolb
Handzame Classic, Luka Mezgec
Stages 1, 2 & 5 Volta a Catalunya, Luka Mezgec
Stage 2 (ITT) Critérium International, Tom Dumoulin
Gent–Wevelgem, John Degenkolb
Stage 2 Circuit de la Sarthe, Jonas Ahlstrand
Scheldeprijs, Marcel Kittel
Stages 2 & 3 Giro d'Italia, Marcel Kittel
Stage 4 Four Days of Dunkirk, Thierry Hupond
Stage 2 World Ports Classic, Ramon Sinkeldam
Stage 21 Giro d'Italia, Luka Mezgec
Stage 3 Critérium du Dauphiné, Nikias Arndt
Grand Prix of Aargau Canton, Simon Geschke
Stage 1 Ster ZLM Toer, Marcel Kittel
 National Time Trial Championships, Tom Dumoulin
Stages 1, 3, 4 & 21 Tour de France, Marcel Kittel
Stage 3 (ITT) Eneco Tour, Tom Dumoulin
 Points classification Vuelta a España, John Degenkolb
Stages 4, 5, 12 & 17, John Degenkolb
Prologue (ITT) Tour of Alberta, Tom Dumoulin
Stage 2 Tour of Alberta, Jonas Ahlstrand
Stages 1 & 8b Tour of Britain, Marcel Kittel
Paris–Bourges, John Degenkolb
Stage 1 Tour of Beijing, Luka Mezgec

2015 – Team Giant–Alpecin

Down Under Classic, Marcel Kittel
Stage 3 Dubai Tour, John Degenkolb
Stage 2 Tour du Haut Var, Luka Mezgec
Milan–San Remo, John Degenkolb
Stage 6 (ITT) Tour of the Basque Country, Tom Dumoulin
Paris–Roubaix, John Degenkolb
Stages 2 & 5 Bayern–Rundfahrt, John Degenkolb
Velothon Berlin, Ramon Sinkeldam
Stages 1 (ITT) & 9 (ITT) Tour de Suisse, Tom Dumoulin
 National Time Trial Championships, Georg Preidler
Stage 17 Tour de France, Simon Geschke
Stage 1 Tour de Pologne, Marcel Kittel
Stages 9 & 17 (ITT) Vuelta a España, Tom Dumoulin
Kernen Omloop Echt-Susteren, Max Walscheid
Stage 6 Tour of Alberta, Nikias Arndt
Stage 21 Vuelta a España, John Degenkolb

2016 – Team Giant–Alpecin

Stage 1 (ITT) Giro d'Italia, Tom Dumoulin
Stage 21 Giro d'Italia, Nikias Arndt
Stage 4 Tour of Belgium, Zico Waeytens
 National Time Trial Championships, Tom Dumoulin
Stages 9 & 13 (ITT) Tour de France, Tom Dumoulin
 Overall Tour de l'Ain, Sam Oomen
Stage 3, Sam Oomen
Stage 4 Arctic Race of Norway, John Degenkolb
Münsterland Giro, John Degenkolb
Stage 3, 4, 5, 7 & 9 Tour of Hainan, Max Walscheid

2017  – Team Sunweb

Cadel Evans Great Ocean Road Race, Nikias Arndt
Stage 3 Tour of Oman, Søren Kragh Andersen
Stage 1 Tour of the Basque Country, Michael Matthews
 Overall, Giro d'Italia, Tom Dumoulin
Stages 10 (ITT) & 14, Tom Dumoulin
Stage 3 (TTT) Hammer Sportzone Limburg
Stage 5 Critérium du Dauphiné, Phil Bauhaus
Stage 3 Tour de Suisse, Michael Matthews
 National Time Trial Championships, Tom Dumoulin
 National Time Trial Championships, Georg Preidler
 National Road Race Championships, Ramon Sinkeldam
 Mountains classification, Tour de France, Warren Barguil
Stages 13 & 18, Warren Barguil
 Points classification, Tour de France, Michael Matthews
Stages 14 & 16, Michael Matthews
 Overall BinckBank Tour, Tom Dumoulin
Stage 5 Danmark Rundt, Max Walscheid
UCI Road World Championships – Men's team time trial
 UCI World Time Trial Championships, Tom Dumoulin

2018  – Team Sunweb

Stage 3 Abu Dhabi Tour, Phil Bauhaus 
Prologue Tour de Romandie, Michael Matthews 
Stage 1 (ITT) Giro d'Italia, Tom Dumoulin
Stage 3 Tour de Yorkshire, Max Walscheid
Stage 6 Tour de Suisse, Søren Kragh Andersen
Stage 20 (ITT) Tour de France, Tom Dumoulin
Stage 7 BinckBank Tour, Michael Matthews 
Grand Prix Cycliste de Québec, Michael Matthews 
Grand Prix Cycliste de Montréal, Michael Matthews 
Münsterland Giro, Max Walscheid
Paris - Tours, Søren Kragh Andersen

2019  – Team Sunweb

Nokere Koerse, Cees Bol
Stages 2 & 6 Volta a Catalunya, Michael Matthews 
Stage 7 Tour of California, Cees Bol
Stage 1 Tour of Norway, Cees Bol
Stage 21 (ITT)	Giro d'Italia, Chad Haga
Stage 8 Vuelta a España, Nikias Arndt
Grand Prix Cycliste de Québec, Michael Matthews
Omloop van het Houtland, Max Walscheid

2020  – Team Sunweb

 Overall Herald Sun Tour, Jai Hindley
Stage 1, Alberto Dainese
Stages 2 & 4, Jai Hindley
Stage 3 Volta ao Algarve, Cees Bol
Stage 4 (ITT) Paris–Nice, Søren Kragh Andersen
Stage 6 Paris–Nice, Tiesj Benoot
Bretagne Classic, Michael Matthews
Stage 12 Tour de France, Marc Hirschi
Stages 14 & 19 Tour de France, Søren Kragh Andersen
Stage 2 Okolo Slovenska, Nico Denz
La Flèche Wallonne, Marc Hirschi
Stage 4 (ITT) BinckBank Tour, Søren Kragh Andersen
Paris–Tours, Casper Pedersen
Stage 18 Giro d'Italia, Jai Hindley

2021  – Team DSM

Stage 2 Paris–Nice, Cees Bol
 Overall Tour de l'Ain, Michael Storer
Stage 3, Michael Storer
Stage 3 Vuelta a Burgos, Romain Bardet
Stage 5 Tour de Pologne, Nikias Arndt
 Mountains classification Vuelta a España, Michael Storer
Stages 7 & 10, Michael Storer
Stage 14, Romain Bardet

2022  – Team DSM

Stage 5 Tour of Turkey, Sam Welsford 
 Overall Tour of the Alps, Romain Bardet 
Stage 11 Giro d'Italia, Alberto Dainese
Stage 2 Tour de Suisse, Andreas Leknessund
Stage 6 Tour de Suisse, Nico Denz
Stage 6 (ITT) Tour de Pologne, Thymen Arensman
 Overall Arctic Race of Norway, Andreas Leknessund
Stage 4, Andreas Leknessund
Stage 15 Vuelta a España, Thymen Arensman
Stage 2 Tour of Britain, Cees Bol

2023  – Team DSM

Stages 6 & 7 Vuelta a San Juan, Sam Welsford 
Cadel Evans Great Ocean Road Race, Marius Mayrhofer

Supplementary statistics

References

Team DSM (men's team)
Shimano